A doubting Thomas is a skeptic who refuses to believe without direct personal experience.

Doubting Thomas may also refer to:

People and fictional characters
 Thomas the Apostle, apostle of Jesus, basis of the skeptic
 Thomas (activist) (1947–2009), "Doubting" Thomas, anti-nuclear and anti-war activist
 Doubting Thomas, a pal of Lord Snooty

Art
 The Incredulity of Saint Thomas, a painting by Caravaggio
 The Incredulity of Saint Thomas, a triptych painting by Peter Paul Rubens
 The Incredulity of Saint Thomas, a painting by Francesco Salviati
 The Incredulity of Saint Thomas, a painting by Matthias Stom
 Christ and St. Thomas, a bronze statue by Andrea del Verrocchio
 Doubting Thomas (The Incredulity of St. Thomas), a painting by Adriaen van der Werff formerly in the Hope Collection of Pictures

Film and television
 Doubting Thomas (1935 film), an American comedy film 
 Spy School, aka Doubting Thomas, a 2008 children's film

Literature
 Doubting Thomas, a book by Morris Gleitzman

Music
 Doubting Thomas (band), a side project of Canadian group Skinny Puppy
 Doubting Thomas (Charlotte band)
 Doubting Thomas, a song from Why Should the Fire Die?